The women's 4 × 100 metres relay event at the 2022 African Championships in Athletics was held on 9 and 10 August in Port Louis, Mauritius.

Medalists

*Athletes who competed in heats only

Results

Heats
Qualification: First 3 teams of each heat (Q) plus the next 2 fastest (q) qualified for the final.

Final

References

2022 African Championships in Athletics
Relays at the African Championships in Athletics